Act of Violence is a 1949 film noir directed by Fred Zinnemann.

Act of Violence may also refer to:

Act of Violence (1956 film), a 1956 British TV play 
Act of Violence (1959 film), a 1959 Australian remake
Dog Eat Dog (1964 film), pre-release title An Act of Violence, a 1964 German crime drama film 
Act of Violence, a 1979 made-for-television movie starring Elizabeth Montgomery
"Act of Violence", an episode of The F.B.I. TV series
"An Act of Violence", 1976 episode of Joe Forrester (TV series)

See also 
Acts of Violence, a 2018 film starring Bruce Willis
A Simple Act of Violence, a 2008 novel by R. J. Ellory